31st Regiment or 31st Infantry Regiment may refer to:

Infantry regiments 
 31 Combat Engineer Regiment (The Elgins), a unit of the Canadian Army
 31st Infantry Regiment (Thailand), a unit of the Royal Thai Army

 31st (Huntingdonshire) Regiment of Foot, a unit of the United Kingdom Army
 31st Infantry Regiment (United States), a unit of the United States Army

Cavalry regiments 
 31st Mechanized Infantry Regiment "Asturias", a unit of the Spanish Army
 31st Cavalry Regiment (United States), a unit of the United States Army

Artillery regiments 
 31st Reserve Field Artillery Regiment (Ireland), a unit of the Irish Army

Combat support regiments 
 31 (City of London) Signal Regiment, a unit of the United Kingdom Army

American Civil War regiments 
 31st Illinois Volunteer Infantry Regiment
 31st Iowa Volunteer Infantry Regiment
 31st New York Volunteer Infantry Regiment
 31st Infantry Regiment, United States Colored Troops
 31st Wisconsin Volunteer Infantry Regiment

See also
 31st Division (disambiguation)
 31st Group (disambiguation)
 31st Brigade (disambiguation)
 31st Battalion (disambiguation)
 31st Squadron (disambiguation)